Khusainovo (Xösäyen) is a rural locality (a village) in Khalilovsky Selsoviet, Abzelilovsky District, Bashkortostan, Russia. The population was 23 as of 2010. There are 2 streets.

Geography 
Khusainovo is located 41 km south of Askarovo (the district's administrative centre) by road. Abdulmambetovo is the nearest rural locality.

References 

Rural localities in Abzelilovsky District